Coleridge is a surname. Notable people with the surname include:

Amy Coleridge (1864–1951), British actress 
 Arthur Coleridge (1830–1913), British lawyer, cricketer and musician
 Bernard Coleridge, 2nd Baron Coleridge (1851–1927), British politician, son of John Duke Coleridge
 Charles Coleridge (1827–1875), English cricketer who played for Hampshire
 Christabel Rose Coleridge (1843–1921), English novelist
 Derwent Coleridge (1800–1883, British scholar and teacher, son of Samuel Taylor Coleridge
 Ernest Hartley Coleridge (1846–1920), British literary scholar, son of Derwent Coleridge
 Ethel Coleridge (1883–1976), English actress
 Geoffrey Coleridge, 3rd Baron Coleridge (1877–1955), Justice of Peace for Devon
 Georgina Coleridge (1916–2003), Scottish journalist, magazine editor and publishing executive
 Hartley Coleridge (1796–1849), British writer, son of Samuel Taylor Coleridge
 Henry James Coleridge (1822–1893), English writer on religious affairs and preacher
 Henry Nelson Coleridge (1798–1843), British lawyer, nephew and son-in-law of Samuel Taylor Coleridge
 Herbert Coleridge (1830–1861), British philologist and lexicographer, son of Sara Coleridge and Henry Nelson Coleridge
 James Coleridge (1759–1836), ship's captain and elder brother of Samuel Taylor Coleridge 
 John Coleridge (Indian Army officer) (1878–1951), British army officer
 John Coleridge, 1st Baron Coleridge (1820–1894), British lawyer and politician, son of John Taylor Coleridge
 John Taylor Coleridge (1790–1876), British judge, nephew of Samuel Taylor Coleridge
 Mark Coleridge (born 1948), an Australian Roman Catholic archbishop
 Mary Elizabeth Coleridge (1861–1907), British poet (family connection to Samuel Taylor Coleridge but not a direct descendant)
 Nicholas Coleridge (born 1957), British editor
 Sir Paul Coleridge (born 1949), retired judge of the High Court of England and Wales
 Richard Coleridge, 4th Baron Coleridge (1905–1984), naval officer
 Samuel Coleridge-Taylor (1875–1912), British composer 
 Samuel Taylor Coleridge (1772–1834), British poet and critic
 Sara Coleridge (1802–1852), British writer, daughter of Samuel Taylor Coleridge, and wife of her cousin Henry Nelson Coleridge
 Stephen Coleridge (1854–1936), English author
 Sylvia Coleridge (1909–1986), British actress
 William Coleridge (1789–1849), Bishop of Barbados
 William Coleridge, 5th Baron Coleridge (born 1937), a British hereditary peer

See also
Template:Coleridge family tree showing relationship between many of the above
 Baron Coleridge of Ottery St Mary in the County of Devon, a title in the Peerage of the United Kingdom
Coleridge-Taylor Perkinson (1932–2004), American composer named after Samuel Coleridge-Taylor 

de:Coleridge
pl:Coleridge